The State Customs Service of Turkmenistan — is a governmental agency of management performing the state policy in the field of regulation of activities of customs system of Turkmenistan, providing observance of the international obligations of Turkmenistan on customs questions, and also performing fight against smuggling and other crimes, administrative offenses in the sphere of its activities. 

It was founded by decree on 4 November 1991.

Structure 

 Central Office
 Altyn Asyr Customs Training Center
 Directorate of Economic Management
 Customs Units
 6 customs administrations
 51 customs posts

Altyn Asyr Customs Training Center 
The Altyn Asyr Customs Training Center in Ashgabat provides advanced training for customs service employees. The center provides English language training for customs officials.

Chairmen 
 Mammadklych Kabaev (29 July 1992-2 April 1993)
 Khabibulla Durdyev (25 June 1993-6 December 1998)
 Mered Khalovezov (6 December 1998-26 February 2001)
 Oraz Veliatayev (28 February 2001-29 July 2002)
 Alexander Grishin (29 July 2002-25 January 2006)
 Muradberdy Annalyev (25 January 2006-19 June 2008)
 Yaylym Berdiyev (19 June 2008-21 January 2009)
 Orazgeldy Esenov (21 January 2009-22 January 2009)
 Meredgeldy Berdyev (22 January 2009-2 August 2011)
 Annamuhammed Khojamkuliev (2 August 2011-4 August 2015)
 Dovrangeldy Bayramov (8 August 2015-1 March 2016)
 Mammetkhan Chakyev (1 March 2016-1 June 2017)
 Yazdurdy Soyegov (1 June 2017-25 October 2017)
 Atadurdy Osmanov (25 October 2017-8 July 2019)
 Maksat Khudaikulyev (since 8 July 2019)

References

Links 
Türkmenistanyň Döwlet gümrük gullugy 
Таможенный союз - ГТС Туркменистана

Government of Turkmenistan
Government agencies established in 1991
1991 establishments in Turkmenistan